Mavis Jones (10 December 1922 - 1990) was an Australian cricketer. Jones was born in Melbourne, Victoria, and played three women's Test matches for the Australia national women's cricket team. She died in Lakes Entrance, Victoria.

References

1922 births
1990 deaths
Australia women Test cricketers